The 2003 Silicon Valley Football Classic was a post-season college football bowl game between the UCLA Bruins and the Fresno State Bulldogs on December 30, 2003, at Spartan Stadium in San Jose, California. It was the fourth time the Silicon Valley Football Classic was played and the final game of the 2003 NCAA Division I-A football season for both teams. Fresno State defeated UCLA 17–9. It was the sixth time the two teams had met on the field and the first victory for Fresno State.

For the 2003 bowl season the Silicon Valley Classic had contractual tie-ins with the Western Athletic Conference (WAC) and the Pacific-10 Conference (Pac-10). The SVC organizers had a choice between UCLA and the Washington Huskies, both of whom finished the season 6–6 and bowl eligible, to represent the Pac-10. The SVC invited UCLA, citing UCLA's victory against Washington earlier in the season.

Since the beginning of the bowl in 2000, the Fresno State Bulldogs represented the WAC. Fresno State and the Tulsa Golden Hurricane finished the season tied for second in the WAC and available for the SVC. Fresno State returned to the SVC for the fourth straight year, while Tulsa went to the Humanitarian Bowl.

References

Silicon Valley Classic
Silicon Valley Football Classic
Fresno State Bulldogs football bowl games
UCLA Bruins football bowl games
Silicon Valley Football
December 2003 sports events in the United States